Pietro Fantin (born 28 November 1991 in Curitiba) is a Brazilian racing driver.

Career

Fantin began his racing career in karting, where he remained until 2009. In 2010 he began his formula racing career. For Hitech Racing Brazil he participated in 9 of 24 races in the Formula Three Sudamericana. He won three races and achieved five podium finishes. In the championship, he concluded the season on the ninth position. Moreover, he completed nine starts as a guest driver for Hitech Racing in the 2010 British Formula 3 season. In 2011 he competes in the British Formula 3 Championship as a regular driver of Hitech Racing. Fantin finished the 2011 season on eighth position.

For 2012 Fantin will drive for Carlin in British Formula 3 Championship.

Racing record

Career summary

† – As Fantin was a guest driver, he was ineligible for points.

Complete Formula Renault 3.5 Series results
(key) (Races in bold indicate pole position) (Races in italics indicate fastest lap)

References

External links
 
 

1991 births
Living people
Sportspeople from Curitiba
Brazilian racing drivers
Formula 3 Sudamericana drivers
British Formula Three Championship drivers
Formula 3 Euro Series drivers
FIA Formula 3 European Championship drivers
World Series Formula V8 3.5 drivers
Carlin racing drivers
Arden International drivers
Draco Racing drivers
Hitech Grand Prix drivers